Since July 1993, Billboard has published the best-selling Latin albums in the United States on the Top Latin Albums chart. Latin music is defined by Billboard and the Recording Industry Association of America (RIAA) as a music release with 51 percent or more of its content in the Spanish language. On October 17, 2017, Billboard published a list of the 25 best-selling Latin albums in country since September 1992. , the best-selling Latin album in the United States is Dreaming of You by Selena, her fifth and final studio album, which was posthumously released in 1995. It has sold three million copies since its release. Dreaming of You became the first predominantly Spanish-language album to top the Billboard 200 and was the best-selling Latin album of 1995 and 1996. Selena's fourth studio album, Amor Prohibido, has sold more than 1,246,000 copies and is the fourth best-selling Latin album in the United States.

Sales data is compiled by Nielsen SoundScan from a sample that includes music stores, music departments at electronics and stores, Internet sales (both physical and digital) and verifiable sales from concert venues in the United States. Nielsen SoundScan has tracked sales of records in the country since March 1991. SoundScan does not include sales from small retailers without electronic cash registers and nontraditional outlets such as flea markets and drugstores. Prior to the inception of the Top Latin Albums chart, sales of Latin albums were reported by Latin music retailers and distributors and divided into three subcategories: Latin Pop, Tropical/Salsa, and Regional Mexican.

Sales certifications for US album sales are presented by the RIAA, who began awarding certifications in 1958. Initially, certifications were based on units shipped to retail outlets: sales of 500,000 are awarded gold, 1,000,000 for platinum and 2,000,000 or more for multi-platinum. On February 1, 2016, the RIAA updated its methodology for certifying albums by including audio streaming and track sales equivalent. Beginning in 2000, the RIAA launched the Gold and Platinum Awards (Spanish: Los Premios Oro y Platino) to acknowledge the Latin music market in the United States. , the current thresholds for the Latin certifications are 30,000 sales for gold (Disco de oro), 60,000 sales for platinum (Disco de platino), and 120,000 sales or more for multi-platinum (Disco de multi-platino). The previous thresholds for Latin certifications were 50,000 sales for gold, 100,000 sales for platinum, and 200,000 sales for multi-platinum.

The first Latin artist to have two Spanish-language albums certified platinum was Luis Miguel, with Romance and Segundo Romance. The latter album is also the 21st best-selling Latin record in the United States with sales of over 603,000 copies. Me Estoy Enamorando by Alejandro Fernández and Vuelve by Ricky Martin were the best-selling Latin albums of 1998 and 1999, respectively, and were both certified platinum by the RIAA. Shakira and Maná are the only acts with more than two albums on the list. Shakira's albums Pies Descalzos and Dónde Están los Ladrones? were both certified Platinum while her 2005 album, Fijación Oral, Vol. 1 was certified eleven times Disco de platino. Maná is the act with the most entries on the list, with four albums: ¿Dónde Jugarán los Niños?, Sueños Líquidos, MTV Unplugged and Amar es Combatir. , the most-certified album is Dreaming of You, which has been awarded Disco de platino 59 times, representing 3,540,000 units.

Best-selling albums
Positions are as of October 2017; sales, where shown, are from the reference given, which may be at a different date, and cannot be used to infer changes in position.

See also

List of best-selling albums in the United States
List of best-selling Latin singles in the United States

Notes

References

American music industry
Latin